Michael Mount Waldorf School is one of 18 registered schools in Southern Africa that practice Waldorf education.

Facts at a glance

.

 Type of school: Michael Mount Waldorf School is a private, co-educational day school in Bryanston, Johannesburg, South Africa. The school caters for early childhood, nursery, primary, middle and high school students – up to Matric. 
 Number of students: 680
 Average class size: 25
 Number of teachers: 65
 Teacher qualifications: Degree plus a 2-year Waldorf education certificate. All teachers undergo mandatory biennial appraisals and training.
 Curriculum: The Curriculum of the Waldorf schools is used up to Class 11. It includes all subjects required by the Department of Basic Education. 
 Matric: Michael Mount students write the internationally recognised Independent Examinations Board (IEB) National Senior Certificate examinations in Matric.
 Of note: Michael Mount students have maintained a 100% pass rate since the first Matric class wrote finals in 1987.
 Support measures: include Waldorf Extra Lessons, Curative Eurythmy, Support Teaching and Integrated Learning Therapy.
 Sport: Athletics, basketball, cricket, hockey, netball, soccer, swimming and tennis. 
 Extra-curricular activities: These vary from year to year and can include any of the following: climbing, chess, drama, horse riding and music: orchestra, choir and individual instrument tuition.
 After-care: Available for children up to age 10. 
 Campus size: 6 hectares. 
 Enrolment requirements: Visit the school and attend an Introductory Talk. Pupil to undergo an entrance assessment followed by a teacher-pupil and teacher-family interview.
 Memberships: Michael Mount is a member of:
 *  Independent Schools Association of Southern Africa (ISASA) 
 *  Southern African Federation of Waldorf Schools
 *  International Association for Steiner / Waldorf Early Childhood Education.
 Status: The school is registered as a non-profit Organisation (NPO no: 001/314), as well as a Public Benefit Organisation (PBO no: 930003714).

A brief history of the School 

 1960: Michael Mount Waldorf School is founded. 
 1964: The school acquires a 5 hectare campus on Culross Road in Bryanston.
 1971: The swimming pool is completed.
 1973: The tennis courts and first three permanent classrooms are completed.
 1975: The nursery school moves into permanent classrooms.
 1980: The high school starts.
 1987: The first group of Michael Mount students write matric.
 1989: Building of the school's auditorium commences.
 1990: The aftercare facility is established.
 1996: The Cyber Centre is completed.
 2000: Start of the Toddler Group for children aged 2 to 3.
 2001: Double streaming introduced. 
 2004: Four new classrooms for the high school completed.
 2006: Building of a new high school block commences in November. 
 2009: The Library is completely transformed. Computerised cataloguing starts.
 2009: Double streaming reaches the high school.
 2011: Michael Mount acquires the Steiner Centre from the Anthroposophical Society on campus. It becomes the Steiner Centre for Art, Music and Drama. 
 2015: Two adjacent properties are purchased bringing the total size of the Michael Mount campus to 6 hectares.
 2016: The Early Childhood Centre is established.
 2016: Extension of the high school block to incorporate more classrooms.
2018: The AdVenture Leadership programme for post-matric students is launched
2019: Centenary of Waldorf education celebrated worldwide
2020: Michael Mount celebrates its 60th year

References

External links 
 Michael Mount Waldorf official site

Waldorf schools in South Africa
Schools in Johannesburg
Private schools in Gauteng
Educational institutions established in 1960
1960 establishments in South Africa